Jeff Dongvillo (born 1953) is a former member of the Michigan House of Representatives.

Early life
Dongvillo was born in 1953 in Fountain, Michigan.

Education
Dongvillo was earned a Bachelor of Science in political science from Grand Valley State University.

Career
Dongvillo unsuccessfully ran in the 1974 Democratic primary for the Michigan Senate seat representing the 33rd district. On November 7, 1978, Dongvillo was elected to the Michigan House of Representatives where he represented the 98th district from January 10, 1979 to 1980. Dongvillo was not re-elected in 1980. In 1982, Dongvillo once again ran for the Michigan Senate seat representing the 33rd district, where he won the nomination, but lost the election.

Personal life
Dongvillo is Catholic.

References

Living people
1953 births
Catholics from Michigan
People from Mason County, Michigan
Grand Valley State University alumni
Democratic Party members of the Michigan House of Representatives
20th-century American politicians